Bob Brown (born 1944) is the former Australian Greens parliamentary leader.

Bob Brown may also refer to:

Other politicians
 Bob Brown (Australian Labor politician) (1933–2022), former Australian Labor Party politician
 Bob Brown (Montana politician) (born 1947), Secretary of State of Montana

Sports

Football (soccer)
 Bob Brown (footballer, born 1869) (1869–?), English footballer with Southampton and Queen's Park Rangers in the 1890s
 Bob Brown (footballer, born 1870) (1870–1943), Scottish footballer with Cambuslang, Sheffield Wednesday, Bolton Wanderers, Scotland 
 Bob Brown (footballer, born 1895) (1895–1980), English-born footballer who played as a left back

Gridiron football
 Bob Brown (Canadian football) (born ), Canadian football player
 Bob Brown (defensive lineman) (1940–1998), American NFL football player, 1966–1976
 Bob Brown (offensive lineman) (born 1941), American NFL football player (1964–1973)

Baseball
 Bob Brown (baseball, born 1876) (1876–1962), member of the Canadian Baseball Hall of Fame
 Bob Brown (pitcher) (1911–1990), American baseball pitcher for the Boston Braves (1930–1936)

Basketball
 Bob Brown (basketball, born 1921) (1921–2001), American basketball player in the NBA in the 1940s
 Bob Brown (basketball, born 1923) (1923–2016), American basketball player in the NBL in the 1940s

Other sports
 Bob Brown (motorcyclist) (1930–1960), Australian motorcycle road racer
 Bob Brown (ice hockey) (born 1950), Canadian former professional ice hockey player who played in the World Hockey Association
 Bob Brown (rugby league) (1907–1987), English rugby league footballer 
 Bob Brown (rugby union) (born 1953), rugby union player who represented Australia
 Bob Brown (wrestler) (1938–1997), Canadian professional wrestler

Others
 Bob Brown (comics) (1915–1977), American comic book artist
 Bob Brown (The Unit), a character on the CBS television series The Unit
 Bob Brown (newspaper publisher) (1930–1984), Nevada newspaper editor and publisher
 Bob Brown (writer, poet, publisher) (1886–1959), American writer and publisher

See also
 Bobby Brown (disambiguation)
 Rob Brown (disambiguation) 
 Robby Brown (disambiguation)
 Robert Brown (disambiguation)
 Robert Browne (disambiguation)
 Bob Braun (1929–2001), American television and radio personality